Events in 1998 in animation.

Events

February
 February 4: The South Park episode "Damien" premieres, featuring the debut of Satan.
 February 8: The Simpsons episode "The Joy of Sect" is first broadcast.
 February 18: The South Park episode "Mecha-Streisand" premieres, guest starring Robert Smith from The Cure.

March
 March 15: The first episode of PB&J Otter airs.
 March 23: 70th Academy Awards: Geri's Game by Jan Pinkava wins the Academy Award for Best Animated Short.

April
 April 1: The South Park episode "Terrance and Phillip in Not Without My Anus" first airs, in which Satan is depicted having a relationship with Saddam Hussein. However the episode was panned by many South Park fans as it preempted the second part of the cliffhanger ending of season 1 where Eric Cartman needs to reveal the identity of his father. As a result of angry letters from fans, the second part of the episode aired on April 22.
 April 3: The first episode of Cowboy Bebop airs.
 April 4: The first episodes of CatDog and Yu-Gi-Oh! air.
 April 13: The final episode of Stickin' Around airs.
April 20: The first episode of Stressed Eric airs.
 April 26: The Simpsons airs its 200th episode, "Trash of the Titans", guest starring the band U2 and actor Steve Martin.

May
 May 14: The first episode of Celebrity Deathmatch is broadcast.
 May 15: Quest for Camelot is released.
 May 17: The Simpsons episode "Natural Born Kissers" premieres, in which a nude Homer and Marge have to run from being discovered.
 May 28: American voice actor Phil Hartman (voice of Troy McClure and Lionel Hutz in The Simpsons) is murdered by his wife who was under the influence of drugs, and committed suicide afterward.

June
 June 19: The Walt Disney Company releases Mulan.
 June 22: The first episode of Bob and Margaret is broadcast.

July
 July 19: The first episode of Oh Yeah! Cartoons airs.
 July 21: The first episode of Lascars airs.
 July 24: Roy O. Disney receives a star at the Hollywood Walk of Fame.

August
 August 31: The first episode of Disney's Hercules is broadcast.

September
 September 1 - The first episodes of Cousin Skeeter and The Wild Thornberrys air.
 September 4: The first episode of Archibald the Koala airs.
 September 6: The first episode of Oggy and the Cockroaches airs.
 September 12: The first episode of Godzilla: The Series airs.
 September 14: The first episode of Histeria! airs.
 September 27: The Simpsons episode "Bart the Mother" premieres, featuring the last speaking appearance of Troy McClure after Phil Hartman's death on May 28, 1998. The character was retired after this episode. This is also the last episode David X. Cohen wrote before leaving the series to work on Futurama. However, he later wrote the season 32 episode "Podcast News" in 2020.

October
 October 2: DreamWorks Animation's first film, Antz, directed by Eric Darnell and Tim Johnson, is released.
 October 3: The first episode of Anatole airs.
 October 4 - The first episode of Rolie Polie Olie airs.
 October 5: The first episode of Ojarumaru airs.
 October 9: The first episode of The Wacky Adventures of Ronald McDonald airs. 
 Specific date unknown: The Japanese animation studio Bones is founded.

November
 November 2: Chris Wedge's Bunny is first released.
 November 8: The Simpsons episode "When You Dish Upon a Star" premieres, which had a cutaway at the end which showed the 20th Century Fox studio with "A division of The Walt Disney Co." at the bottom of the studio sign. This episode would get renewed attention 20 years later after Disney's acquisition of Fox in 2019.
 November 16: Steamboat Willie is added to the National Film Registry.
 November 18: The first episode of The Powerpuff Girls airs on Cartoon Network.
 November 20: 
 The Rugrats Movie premiers.
 The film A Bug's Life by Pixar and the Walt Disney Company airs.
 November 28: The first episode of Bob the Builder airs.

December
 December 9: Michel Ocelot's Kirikou and the Sorceress premiers.
 December 16: The South Park episode "Gnomes" first airs, in which Tweek Meak makes his debut.
 December 18: The film The Prince of Egypt premiers.
 December 21: The first episode of Rex the Runt airs.
 December 23: Enzo D'Alò's Lucky and Zorba premiers.

Specific date unknown
 Mikhail Tumelya's The Magic Pipe is released.
 The first episode of Fat Dog Mendoza airs.

Films released 

 January 6 - Hercules and Xena – The Animated Movie: The Battle for Mount Olympus (United States)
 January 16 - H.C. Andersen's The Long Shadow (Denmark)
 February 6 - General Chaos: Uncensored Animation (United States)
 February 17:
 Belle's Magical World (United States)
 Camelot (United States)
 March 7:
 Doraemon: Nobita's South Sea Adventure (Japan)
 Galaxy Express 999: Eternal Fantasy (Japan)
 March 17:
 Batman & Mr. Freeze: SubZero (United States)
 FernGully 2: The Magical Rescue (United States)
 April 3 - Grandma and Her Ghosts (Taiwan)
 April 18:
 Crayon Shin-chan: Blitzkrieg! Pig's Hoof's Secret Mission (Japan)
 Detective Conan: The Fourteenth Target (Japan)
 April 21 - FAKE (Japan)
 April 24 - Królestwo Zielonej Polany. Powrót (Poland)
 April 25 - MAZE ☆ The Mega-Burst Space: The Giant of Temporary Threat (Japan)
 May 2 - Camelot: The Legend (United States)
 May 15 - Quest for Camelot (United States)
 May 18 - The Brave Little Toaster Goes to Mars (United States and United Kingdom)
 May 20 - Socialisation of the Bull? (Slovenia)
 May 21 - Golgo 13: Queen Bee (Japan)
 May 26 - The Legend of Su-Ling (United States)
 June 16 - The Mighty Kong (United States)
 June 19:
 Mulan (United States)
 A Tale of Egypt (United States)
 July 13 - Moses: Egypt's Great Prince (United States)
 July 14 - The Spirit of Mickey (Australia)
 July 17:
 Ahmed, Prince of Alhambra (Spain)
 Gen¹³ (United States)
 July 18 - Pokémon: The First Movie – Mewtwo Strikes Back (Japan)
 July 21:
 The Animated Adventures of Tom Sawyer (United States)
 VeggieTales: Madame Blueberry (United States)
 July 24 - Lupin III: Crisis in Tokyo (Japan)
 July 25 - Soreike! Anpanman Tenohira o Taiyō ni (Japan)
 August 1:
 Gundam Wing: Endless Waltz -Special Edition- (Japan)
 Mobile Suit Gundam: The 08th MS Team – Miller's Report (Japan)
 Slayers Gorgeous (Japan)
 August 4 - The Swan Princess: The Mystery of the Enchanted Kingdom (United States)
 August 7 - Gurin with the Foxtail (Norway)
 August 25 - Pocahontas II: Journey to a New World (United States)
 August 27 - Silant Legend (Malaysia)
 September 4 - What Neighbours are Animals! (Spain)
 September 5 - Spriggan (Japan)
 September 22 - Scooby-Doo on Zombie Island (United States)
 October 2 - Antz (United States)
 October 13 - Buster & Chauncey's Silent Night (United States)
 October 16 - Rudolph the Red-Nosed Reindeer: The Movie (United States)
 October 27 - The Lion King II: Simba's Pride (United States)
 November 7 - Visitor (Japan)
 November 8 - Reise um die Erde in 80 Tagen (China and Germany)
 November 16 - An American Tail: The Treasure of Manhattan Island (United States)
 November 17:
 An All Dogs Christmas Carol (United States)
 Money, A Mythology of Darkness (Greece)
 November 20:
 A Bug's Life (United States)
 The Rugrats Movie (United States)
 November 24 - VeggieTales: The End of Silliness? (United States)
 December 1 - The Land Before Time VI: The Secret of Saurus Rock (United States)
 December 4 - Circleen: City Mouse (Denmark)
 December 9 - Kirikou and the Sorceress (France, Belgium and Luxembourg)
 December 11 - Touch: Miss Lonely Yesterday (Japan)
 December 18:
 Fire Force DNAsights 999.9 (Japan)
 The Prince of Egypt (United States)
 December 19 - Beast Wars II: Lio Convoy's Close Call! (Japan)
 December 22 - The Secret of NIMH 2: Timmy to the Rescue (United States)
 December 23 - Lucky and Zorba (Italy)
 December 25 - Luminous Visions (United States)
 Specific date unknown: 
 Ancient Alien (United States)
 Camelot (Australia)
 Greatest Heroes and Legends of the Bible: Daniel and the Lion's Den (United States)
 Greatest Heroes and Legends of the Bible: David and Goliath (United States)
 Greatest Heroes and Legends of the Bible: The Garden of Eden (United States)
 Greatest Heroes and Legends of the Bible: Jonah and the Whale (United States)
 Greatest Heroes and Legends of the Bible: The Last Supper, Crucifixion and Resurrection (United States)
 Greatest Heroes and Legends of the Bible: The Miracles of Jesus (United States)
 Greatest Heroes and Legends of the Bible: Samson and Delilah (United States)
 Greatest Heroes and Legends of the Bible: The Story of Moses (United States)
 The Legend of Mulan (Netherlands)
 The Little Mermaid (Australia)
 The Magic Forest (Germany)
 The Magic Pipe (Russia)
 Mu-lan (Italy)
 Mulan (Australia)
 Otoko wa Tsurai yo: Torajirō Wasure na Kusa (Japan)
 Prince of the Nile: The Story of Moses (Australia)
 The Story of Rennyo (Japan)
 Le Voyage de la Souris (France)

Television series debuts

Television series endings

Births

January
 January 23: Rachel Crow, American singer and actress (voice of Carla in Rio 2, Tip in Home: Adventures with Tip & Oh, Imara in The Lion Guard episode "Return to the Pride Lands").
 January 28: Ariel Winter, American actress (voice of Sofia in Sofia the First, Gretchen in Phineas and Ferb, Marina in Jake and the Never Land Pirates).
 January 31: Chills, Canadian internet personality and singer (voice of Patron in Smiling Friends).

February
 February 15: Zachary Gordon, American actor (voice of Little Lopart in Handy Manny, San San in Ni Hao, Kai-Lan, Kotaro in Afro Samurai: Resurrection, Matt Mattin in Star Wars Rebels, first voice of Gil in Bubble Guppies).
 February 21: Zach Aguilar, American actor (voice of Genos in One Punch Man, Tanjiro Kamado in Demon Slayer: Kimetsu no Yaiba, Koichi Hirose in JoJo's Bizarre Adventure: Diamond Is Unbreakable, Arthur Pendragon in The Seven Deadly Sins, Joyride in Power Players).

June
 June 19: Atticus Shaffer, American actor (voice of Edgar in Frankenweenie, Ono in The Lion Guard, Peedee Fryman in Steven Universe, Fox in Home: Adventures with Tip and Oh, Dennis in Star vs. the Forces of Evil, Albert Glass in Fish Hooks, Melvin in Harvey Girls Forever!).
 June 24: Soma Chhaya, Canadian-American singer, rapper and actress (voice of Shauzia in The Breadwinner).

July
 July 8: Maya Hawke, American actress and singer-songwriter (voice of Abyss in the Moon Girl and Devil Dinosaur episode "Moon Girl's Day Off").
 July 24: Bindi Irwin, Australian television personality, conservationist, zookeeper and actress (voice of Bindi Bungee in the Curious George episode "Monkey Down Under", Isla Coralton in the Spidey and His Amazing Friends episode "Sonic Boom Boom").
 July 31: Rico Rodriguez, American actor (voice of Raha in The Lion Guard, Luigi Vendetta in the Kick Buttowski: Suburban Daredevil episode "Luigi Vendetta", Snow-Foot in the Jake and the Never Land Pirates episode "The Legendary Snow-Foot!").

August
 August 1: Khamani Griffin, American actor (voice of Khalid in Sofia the First, Cal Devereaux in Cloudy with a Chance of Meatballs 2, Caleb in Rise of the Guardians).
 August 12: Lily Snowden-Fine, British former child actress and daughter of David Fine and Alison Snowden (voice of the title character in Peppa Pig, additional voices in Bob and Margaret).

October
 October 23: Amandla Stenberg, American actress (voice of Bia in Rio 2).

November
 November 4: Darcy Rose Byrnes, Irish-American actress and singer (voice of Amber in Sofia the First, Ikki in The Legend of Korra).

December
 December 16: Kiara Muhammad, American actress (voice of the title character in the first two seasons of Doc McStuffins, Kari in Sofia the First).

Deaths

January
 January 4: Mae Questel, American actress (voice of Betty Boop and Olive Oyl), dies at age 89.
 January 7: Eli Bauer, American comics artist and animator (Terrytoons, Sesame Street), dies at age 69.
 January 21: Yoshifumi Kondō, Japanese animator (Studio Ghibli) and director (Whisper of the Heart), dies at age 47.
 January 28: Shotaro Ishinomori, Japanese manga artist (creator of Cyborg 009), dies at age 60.

February
 February 14: Thomas McKimson, American comics artist and animator (Walt Disney Company, Warner Bros. Cartoons), dies at age 90.
 February 21: Art Seidel, American production manager (assistant director for the live-action sequence in The Simpsons episode "Treehouse of Horror VI"), dies at age 66.
 February 23: Philip Abbott, American actor (voice of Nick Fury in Iron Man and Spider-Man), dies at age 73.
 February 24: Milicent Patrick, American actress, makeup artist, special effects designer and animator (Fantasia, Dumbo), dies at age 82.
 February 26: James Algar, American film director, screenwriter, and producer (The Walt Disney Company), dies at age 85.

April
 April 17: Linda McCartney, American photographer and activist (voiced herself in The Simpsons episode "Lisa the Vegetarian"), dies from breast cancer at age 56.
 April 23: Enrique Riverón, Cuban-American cartoonist, animator and comics artist (Walt Disney Animation Studios), dies at age 95 or 96.

May
 May 14: Frank Sinatra, American singer and actor (voice of Singing Sword in Who Framed Roger Rabbit), dies from a heart attack at age 82.
 May 28: Phil Hartman, Canadian-American actor, comedian, screenwriter and graphic designer (voice of Professor Von Joy, Hans-Cuff and Staks in Challenge of the GoBots, Mr. Wilson, Henry Mitchell and Ruff in Dennis the Menace, Air Conditioner and Hanging Lamp in The Brave Little Toaster, Troy McClure and Lionel Hutz in The Simpsons, Psycho Bunny in Eek! The Cat, Calaboose Cal, Hot Dog Vendor and Inspector De Paws in Tom & Jerry Kids, Adolph Hitmaker, Tom Morgan in The Pagemaster, Russian Filmreel Announcer and Midget Clown in The Ren & Stimpy Show, Chauncey in Buster & Chauncey's Silent Night, Game Show Host in the Happily Ever After: Fairy Tales for Every Child episode "The Empress' Nightingale", Vaccu-Spook Auctioneer in The 13 Ghosts of Scooby-Doo episode "Reflections in a Ghoulish Eye", School Patrol Robots and Executive Vice President in The Jetsons episode "Boy George", Captain Frye in the DuckTales episode "Scrooge's Pet", Ace London in the TaleSpin episode "Mach One for the Gipper", Paddywhack in the Darkwing Duck episode "the Haunting of Mr. Banana Brain", Dimitri in the Captain Planet and the Planeteers episode "Mind Pollution", Inspector C. Bass in the Fish Police episode "A Fish Out of Water", Bernie Wasserman and Professor Blowhard in The Critic episode "Eyes on the Prize", Dan Anchorman in the Animaniacs episode "Broadcast Nuisance", Jiji in Kiki's Delivery Service, announcer for Cartoon Network), was murdered at age 49.
 May 31: Sherman Labby, American storyboard artist and production illustrator (Filmation, Hanna-Barbera, Marvel Productions), dies from muscular dystrophy at age 68.

June
 June 3: William L. Snyder, American film producer (Rembrandt Films), dies at age 80.
 June 5: Jeanette Nolan, American actress (voice of Ellie Mae in The Rescuers, Widow Tweed in The Fox and the Hound), dies from a stroke at age 86.
 June 12: 
 Retta Davidson, American animator (Walt Disney Animation Studios, Chuck Jones, Ralph Bakshi), dies at age 76.
 Richard Thompson, American animator and film director (Warner Bros. Cartoons, MGM, Hanna-Barbera, DePatie-Freleng Enterprises, Bill Melendez), dies at age 83.
 June 28: Jean-Yves Raimbaud, French animator and screenwriter (Space Goofs, Oggy and the Cockroaches), dies from lung cancer at age 40.

July
 July 6: Roy Rogers, American singer and actor (narrator of the Pecos Bill segment in Melody Time), dies at age 86.
 July 8: Dušan Vukotić, Yugoslav-Croatian cartoonist and animator (Zagreb Film, Ersatz), dies at age 71. 
 July 16: Tony Sgroi, American comics artist and animator (worked for Warner Bros. animation, Bob Clampett, Walter Lantz, Hanna-Barbera), dies at age 73.
 July 17: Joseph Maher, Irish actor (voice of Emile Dorian in the Batman: The Animated Series episode "Tyger, Tyger"), dies at age 64.

August
 August 14: Stanislav Holý, Czech graphic artist, caricaturist, animation designer, children's book illustrator and animator (Mr. Pip), dies at age 55.
 August 25: Lee Gunther, American film editor (co-founder of Marvel Productions), dies at age 63.

September
 September 6: Whitney Lee Savage, American animator (Mickey Mouse in Vietnam, animated segments in Sesame Street), dies at age 69.

October
 October 3: Roddy McDowall, American actor (voice of Mad Hatter in the DC Animated Universe, Proteus in Gargoyles, the Breadmaster in The Tick, Snowball in Pinky and the Brain, Mr. Soil in A Bug's Life), dies from lung cancer at age 70.
 October 15: Jack Boyd, American animator and special effects creator (Walt Disney Company), dies at age 82.

November
 November 3: Bob Kane, American comic book writer, animator and artist (co-creator of Batman, Cool McCool, and Courageous Cat and Minute Mouse), dies at age 83.
 November 24: Jacques Eggermont, Belgian comics artist and animator (worked for CBA), dies at age 80.
 November 30: Ruth Clifford, American actress (fifth voice of Minnie Mouse and third voice of Daisy Duck) dies at age 98.

December
 December 10: Ray Goossens, Belgian animator (Musti, Plons de Kikker) and comics artist, dies at age 74.
 December 12: Don Patterson, American animator and film director and producer (Walt Disney Company, MGM, Walter Lantz, Hanna-Barbera), dies at age 88.
 December 19: Kazuo Harada, Japanese film director and producer (Studio Comet, Nihon Ad Systems, Tsuchida Production), dies at an unknown age.
 December 21: André LeBlanc, Haitian-American-Brazilian comics artist and animator (worked for Hanna-Barbera), dies at age 77.
 December 25: Richard Paul, American voice actor (voice of Sonny in Coonskin), dies at age 58.
 December 30: G. Stanley Jones, Canadian actor (voice of Lex Luthor in Challenge of the Superfriends, Riff Raff in Heathcliff), dies at age 72.

Sources

See also
1998 in anime

External links 
Animated works of the year, listed in the IMDb

 
1990s in animation